Pseudanophthalmus is a genus of cave beetle. Over 200 species have been described in the caves of ten states of the eastern United States.

Taxonomy
The genus was first named and described by René Jeannel in 1920. Along with the monobasic genus Neaphaenops (also Jeannel) from Kentucky caves, the dibasic genus Nelsonites (Valentine) from Tennessee and Kentucky, and Trechoblemus of Eurasia and North America (Ganglbauer), it forms the “Trechoblemus complex”.

Species
 Pseudanophthalmus acherontis Barr, 1959
 Pseudanophthalmus alabamae Valentine, 1932
 Pseudanophthalmus assimilis Barr, 1981
 Pseudanophthalmus audax (G.Horn, 1883)
 Pseudanophthalmus avernus Valentine, 1945
 Pseudanophthalmus barberi Jeannel, 1928
 Pseudanophthalmus barri Krekeler, 1973
 Pseudanophthalmus beaklei Valentine, 1937
 Pseudanophthalmus bendermani Barr, 1959
 Pseudanophthalmus brevis Valentine, 1932
 Pseudanophthalmus calcareus Barr, 1981
 Pseudanophthalmus catherinae Barr, 1959
 Pseudanophthalmus catoryctos Krekeler, 1973
 Pseudanophthalmus cerberus Barr, 1985
 Pseudanophthalmus chthonius Krekeler, 1973
 Pseudanophthalmus ciliaris Valentine, 1937
 Pseudanophthalmus cnephosus Krekeler, 1973
 Pseudanophthalmus conditus Krekeler, 1973
 Pseudanophthalmus cordicollis Barr, 1981
 Pseudanophthalmus cumberlandus Valentine, 1937
 Pseudanophthalmus darlingtoni Barr, 1985
 Pseudanophthalmus deceptivus Barr, 1981
 Pseudanophthalmus delicatus Valentine, 1932
 Pseudanophthalmus desertus Krekeler, 1973
 Pseudanophthalmus digitus Valentine, 1932
 Pseudanophthalmus egberti Barr, 1965
 Pseudanophthalmus elevatus Valentine, 1932
 Pseudanophthalmus elongatus Krekeler, 1973
 Pseudanophthalmus emersoni Krekeler, 1958
 Pseudanophthalmus engelhardti (Barber, 1928)
 Pseudanophthalmus eremita (G.Horn, 1871)
 Pseudanophthalmus exiguus Krekeler, 1973
 Pseudanophthalmus exoticus Krekeler, 1973
 Pseudanophthalmus farrelli Barr, 1959
 Pseudanophthalmus fastigatus Barr, 1981
 Pseudanophthalmus fowlerae Barr, 1980
 Pseudanophthalmus frigidus Barr, 1981
 Pseudanophthalmus fulleri Valentine, 1932
 Pseudanophthalmus fuscus Valentine, 1931
 Pseudanophthalmus georgiae Barr, 1981
 Pseudanophthalmus globiceps Barr, 1985
 Pseudanophthalmus gracilis Valentine, 1931
 Pseudanophthalmus grandis Valentine, 1931
 Pseudanophthalmus hadenoecus Barr, 1965
 Pseudanophthalmus henroti Jeannel, 1949
 Pseudanophthalmus hesperus Barr, 1959
 Pseudanophthalmus higginbothami Valentine, 1931
 Pseudanophthalmus hirsutus Valentine, 1931
 Pseudanophthalmus hoffmani Barr, 1965
 Pseudanophthalmus holsingeri Barr, 1965
 Pseudanophthalmus horni (Garman, 1892)
 Pseudanophthalmus hortulanus Barr, 1965
 Pseudanophthalmus hubbardi (Barber, 1928)
 Pseudanophthalmus hubrichti Valentine, 1948
 Pseudanophthalmus humeralis Valentine, 1931
 Pseudanophthalmus hypertrichosis Valentine, 1932
 Pseudanophthalmus hypolithos Barr, 1981
 Pseudanophthalmus illinoisensis Barr & Peck, 1966
 Pseudanophthalmus inexpectatus Barr, 1959
 Pseudanophthalmus inquisitor Barr, 1980
 Pseudanophthalmus insularis Barr, 1959
 Pseudanophthalmus intermedius (Valentine, 1931)
 Pseudanophthalmus intersectus Barr, 1965
 Pseudanophthalmus jonesi Valentine, 1945
 Pseudanophthalmus krameri Krekeler, 1973
 Pseudanophthalmus krekeleri Barr, 1965
 Pseudanophthalmus lallemanti Jeannel, 1949
 Pseudanophthalmus leonae Barr, 1960
 Pseudanophthalmus limicola Jeannel, 1931
 Pseudanophthalmus loedingi Valentine, 1931
 Pseudanophthalmus loganensis Barr, 1959
 Pseudanophthalmus longiceps Barr, 1981
 Pseudanophthalmus macradei Valentine, 1948
 Pseudanophthalmus menetriesii (Motschulsky, 1862)
 Pseudanophthalmus montanus Barr, 1965
 Pseudanophthalmus nelsoni Barr, 1965
 Pseudanophthalmus nickajackensis Barr, 1981
 Pseudanophthalmus nortoni Barr, 1981
 Pseudanophthalmus occidentalis Barr, 1959
 Pseudanophthalmus ohioensis Krekeler, 1973
 Pseudanophthalmus orthosulcatus Valentine, 1932
 Pseudanophthalmus packardi Barr, 1959
 Pseudanophthalmus pallidus Barr, 1981
 Pseudanophthalmus paradoxus Barr, 1981
 Pseudanophthalmus parvicollis Jeannel, 1931
 Pseudanophthalmus parvus Krekeler, 1973 (presumed extinct as of 2016)
 Pseudanophthalmus paulus Barr, 1981
 Pseudanophthalmus paynei Barr, 1981
 Pseudanophthalmus petrunkevitchi Valentine, 1945
 Pseudanophthalmus pholeter Krekeler, 1973
 Pseudanophthalmus pilosus Barr, 1985
 Pseudanophthalmus pontis Barr, 1965
 Pseudanophthalmus potomacus Valentine, 1932
 Pseudanophthalmus praetermissus Barr, 1981
 Pseudanophthalmus princeps Barr, 1979
 Pseudanophthalmus productus Barr, 1980
 Pseudanophthalmus pubescens (G.Horn, 1868)
 Pseudanophthalmus punctatus Valentine, 1931
 Pseudanophthalmus pusillus Barr, 1981
 Pseudanophthalmus pusio (G.Horn, 1868)
 Pseudanophthalmus puteanus Krekeler, 1973
 Pseudanophthalmus quadratus Barr, 1965
 Pseudanophthalmus rittmani Krekeler, 1973
 Pseudanophthalmus robustus Valentine, 1931
 Pseudanophthalmus rogersae Barr, 1981
 Pseudanophthalmus rotundatus Valentine, 1932
 Pseudanophthalmus sanctipauli Barr, 1981
 Pseudanophthalmus scholasticus Barr, 1981
 Pseudanophthalmus scutilus Barr, 1981
 Pseudanophthalmus seclusus Barr, 1981
 Pseudanophthalmus sequoyah Barr, 1981
 Pseudanophthalmus sericus Barr, 1981
 Pseudanophthalmus shilohensis Krekeler, 1958
 Pseudanophthalmus sidus Barr, 1965
 Pseudanophthalmus simplex Barr, 1980
 Pseudanophthalmus simulans Barr, 1985
 Pseudanophthalmus solivagus Krekeler, 1973
 Pseudanophthalmus steevesi Barr, 1981
 Pseudanophthalmus striatus (Motschulsky, 1862)
 Pseudanophthalmus sylvaticus Barr, 1967
 Pseudanophthalmus templetoni Valentine, 1948
 Pseudanophthalmus tenebrosus Krekeler, 1973
 Pseudanophthalmus tenesensis Valentine, 1937
 Pseudanophthalmus tenuis (G.Horn, 1871)
 Pseudanophthalmus thomasi Barr, 1981
 Pseudanophthalmus tiresias Barr, 1959
 Pseudanophthalmus transfluvialis Barr, 1985
 Pseudanophthalmus troglodytes Krekeler, 1973
 Pseudanophthalmus tullahoma Barr, 1959
 Pseudanophthalmus umbratilis Krekeler, 1973
 Pseudanophthalmus unionis Barr, 1981
 Pseudanophthalmus valentinei Jeannel, 1949
 Pseudanophthalmus vanburenensis Barr, 1959
 Pseudanophthalmus ventus Barr, 1981
 Pseudanophthalmus vicarius Barr, 1965
 Pseudanophthalmus virginicus (Barr, 1960)
 Pseudanophthalmus wallacei Barr, 1981
 Pseudanophthalmus youngi Krekeler, 1958

References

Trechinae
Cave beetles